Nuconarius is a genus of funnel weavers first described by Zhao & S. Q. Li in 2018.  it contains only three species.

References

External links

Agelenidae
Araneomorphae genera